Lucija "Lu" Jakelić (born 1993) is a Croatian singer and songwriter. Jakelić's debut album Sve o čemu sam šutjela (Everything I was silent about) (2019) reached number one on the Croatian Top of the Shops chart. Her first album spent 34 consecutive weeks on Croatian Best Selling Albums list. Jakelić's sophomore album Šesto Čulo (Sixth Sense) was published on November 25, 2022, and in the first week it also reached number one.

Early life
According to an interview with Telegram on 21 December 2018, Jakelić knew she would become a musician at some point since she comes from a musical family.  When she was eight years old, she started to play the piano.

She obtained a master's degree in Commmunicology at the University of Zagreb.

Mostly by hearing, she learned to play piano and the guitar. As said in many interviews, she was influenced by various music such as Fleetwood Mac, Joni Mitchell, Amy Winehouse, John Mayer, Alanis Morissette, Foo Fighters, grunge, alt-pop and rock musicians. 

Lu spent her childhood and high school years in a small city before she moved to Zagreb to pursue college.

Career
In late 2017, Jakelić appeared in Hrvatska radiotelevizija's television series A strana (A-side). 
Jakelić's debut album Sve o čemu sam šutjela (Everything I Kept Quiet About) was released on 11 November 2019 through Croatia Records. Sve o čemu sam šutjela peaked at number one on the Croatian Albums Chart.

In December 2019, Jakelić was announced as the green-room host of the third season of The Voice Hrvatska.

Artistry

Influences
Jakelić cites Gibonni as her biggest musical influence.

Musical style and songwriting
Jakelić uses her life experiences as an inspiration in her work.

Discography

Studio albums

Singles

References

External links

1995 births
Living people
Croatian pop singers
Croatian voice actresses
People from Đurđevac
21st-century Croatian women singers